Ploughshares is an American literary journal established in 1971 by DeWitt Henry and Peter O'Malley in The Plough and Stars, an Irish pub in Cambridge, Massachusetts. Since 1989, Ploughshares has been based at Emerson College in Boston. Ploughshares publishes issues four times a year, two of which are guest-edited by a prominent writer who explores personal visions, aesthetics, and literary circles. Guest editors have been the recipients of Nobel and Pulitzer prizes, National Book Awards, MacArthur and Guggenheim fellowships, and numerous other honors. Ploughshares also publishes longform stories and essays, known as Ploughshares Solos (collected in the journal's fall issue and published separately as e-books), all of which are edited by the editor-in-chief, Ladette Randolph, and a literary blog, launched in 2009, which publishes critical and personal essays, interviews, and book reviews.

History
In 1970 DeWitt Henry, a Harvard Ph.D. student, and Peter O'Malley, an Irish expatriate, decided to create a literary journal to fill a void they felt existed in the literary scene in Boston. Upon realizing that they and their supporters would never be able to agree on a specific editorial outlook for the magazine, the co-founders decided that the position of editor would be a rotating one. As a result, a majority of Ploughshares issues have been edited by various members of the community, giving the journal a unique and constantly changing voice.

The first issue was published in September 1971.

The magazine soon became recognized as a home for talented new writers. Some of the writers whose first or early works have appeared in Ploughshares are: Russell Banks, Ethan Canin, Raymond Carver, David Foster Wallace, John Irving, Thomas Lux, Sue Miller, Tim O'Brien, Jayne Anne Phillips, Robert Pinsky, and Mona Simpson.

In later years it has gone on to publish some of the leading voices in contemporary literature, including Stephen King, Toni Morrison, Sharon Olds, Louise Gluck, Haruki Murakami, Annie Proulx, Alice Munro, Joy Williams, Mark Strand, Jennifer Egan, and Lydia Davis.

In 1988, Ploughshares became affiliated with Emerson College. Author Don Lee subsequently became Editor-in-Chief, a role he held until 2007. Nine years after becoming affiliated with Emerson, Ploughshares received the first of three large grants from the Wallace–Reader's Digest Funds. Thereafter came rapid growth, state-of-the-art computers, a new design, and aggressive marketing campaigns.

In 2008, Ladette Randolph became Editor-in-Chief. The quality of the magazine's content remains the same, though its appearance has changed to reflect its firm place in today's literary world after launching the blog in 2009, Ploughshares launched its Solos series in 2012; the first.

Ploughshares Solos Omnibus, collecting the first nine Solos in a print volume, was published in 2013. Also that year, all back issues of Ploughshares were made available in digital formats. In 2018, Ploughshares made available its robust archives via an online archive subscription, and converted the Ploughshares Solos Omnibus into a fall issue.

Journal
Ploughshares publishes issues four times per year. Two of these issues—one, prose only; the other; a mix of poetry and prose—are guest-edited by prominent members of the literary community. The other two issues—one, a mix of poetry and prose; the other, longform prose, are edited by staff editors.

Solos 
The Ploughshares Solos Omnibus series collects the first five years of the journal's digitally published Solos in five print volumes. Solos are now collected in the fall longform issue of Ploughshares.[12]

Blog 
In 2009, Ploughshares became home to personal and critical essays, book reviews, and interviews in the form of a blog, which updates almost daily.

Books 
Ploughshares has also published nonfiction, fiction, and poetry books.

1935: A Memoir by Sam Cornish 
1935: A Memoir is a nonfiction work written by Sam Cornish and published by Ploughshares in December 1990. Sam Cornish's 1935 is a memoir of growing up black in Baltimore during the Depression and World War II.

The Ploughshares Poetry Reader
The Ploughshares Poetry Reader celebrates the best of the poetry published in the journal's first 11 volumes, and reflects the editorial commitment to many of their writers. The book was edited by Joyce Peseroff and published in March 1987.

Lie Down in Darkness: A Screenplay by Richard Yates 
Lie Down in Darkness is a screenplay by Richard Yates and edited by William Styron and published by Ploughshares in January 1983. The screenplay follows the dysfunctional Loftis family as they reflect on their lives at the funeral of Peyton, the youngest member of the family.

Guest Editors 
Past guest editors of Ploughshares in alphabetical order.

Cohen Awards
For a list of past winners, see Cohen Awards.

Between 1986 and 2010, Ploughshares honored the best short story and poem published in the journal via the Cohen Awards, wholly sponsored by the journal's longtime patrons Denise and Mel Cohen. Finalists were nominated by staff editors, and the winners, each of whom received a cash prize of $600, were selected by Ploughshares advisory editors. This award is not open for the submission of manuscripts, and has been replaced since 2011 by the Alice Hoffman Prize for Fiction.

Alice Hoffman Prize for Fiction 
Inaugurated in 2011, the annual Alice Hoffman Prize for Fiction honors a short story published in Ploughshares in the previous year (the Spring issue of the previous calendar year through the Winter issue of the current calendar year). The Prize is sponsored by member of the Ploughshares advisory board and longtime patron Alice Hoffman. The winner is selected by Ploughshares editors and receives a cash prize of $2,500. The announcement of the award, along with a short profile of the author, is printed in each year's Spring issue.

Previous Winners

Ashley Leigh Bourne Prize for Fiction 
Forthcoming in 2019, the annual Ashley Leigh Bourne Prize for Fiction honors a short story published in Ploughshares in the previous year (the Summer issue of the previous calendar year through the Spring issue of the current calendar year). The prize is sponsored by longtime patron Hunter C. Bourne III. The winner is selected by Ploughshares editors and receives a cash prize of $2,500. The announcement of the award, along with a short profile of the author, is printed in each year's Summer issue. This award is not open for the submission of manuscripts.

John C. Zacharis First Book Award

For a list of past winners, see John C. Zacharis First Book Award

Since 1991, the John C. Zacharis First Book Award has honored the best first book published by an author who has already published work in Ploughshares. The $1,500 award, which is named after Emerson College's former president, is judged by Ploughshares editors. The announcement of the award, along with a short profile of the author, is printed in each year's Winter issue.

Previous winners

Emerging Writer's Contest 
In the spirit of the journal's founding mission, the Ploughshares Emerging Writer's Contest recognizes work by an emerging writer in each of three genres: fiction, nonfiction, and poetry. One winner in each genre per year receives $2,000, publication in the literary journal, and a conversation with a literary agent. Ploughshares consider authors “emerging” if they haven't published or self-published a book.

Over the years, Ploughshares has helped launch the careers of great writers like Edward P. Jones, Sue Miller, Mona Simpson, Tim O'Brien, and many more.

Honors
Many of past contributors to Ploughshares have received significant accolades. Since the journal's founding in 1971, stories, poems, and essays from Ploughshares have appeared over 150 times in the following award series anthologies: The Best American Poetry, The Best American Short Stories, The Best American Essays, The O. Henry Prize Stories, and The Pushcart Prize: Best of the Small Presses. Ploughshares has had more selections in The Best American Short Stories than any other literary journal in the past ten years. In the past several years, it has had more stories published in The Pushcart Prize anthology than any other publication, and the journal continues to be considered one of the most prestigious in the country.

In popular culture
 One of the protagonists in Stephen King's novel Under the Dome is said to have recently guest-edited an issue of Ploughshares.

See also 
 Ploughshares Guest Editors

References

External links
 
 Ploughshares namesake celebrates its 40th anniversary
 Ladette Randolph's website
 DeWitt Henry's website

Emerson College
Literary magazines published in the United States
Magazines established in 1971
Magazines published in Boston
Quarterly magazines published in the United States